Gianfranco Matteoli (born 21 April 1959) is an Italian retired footballer who played as a midfielder. He currently works as Head of the Youth sector at Serie A club Cagliari.

Club career
During his club career, Matteoli played for Italian sides Cantu San Paolo, Como, Osimana, Reggiana, Sampdoria, Internazionale, Cagliari and Perugia.

Honours

Player
Inter Milan
 Serie A: 1988–89
 Italian Super Cup: 1989

Como
Serie C: 1978–79

International career
At international level, Matteoli earned 6 caps for the Italy national football team between 1986 and 1988.

External links

1959 births
Living people
Italian footballers
Italy under-21 international footballers
Italy international footballers
Como 1907 players
A.C. Reggiana 1919 players
U.C. Sampdoria players
Inter Milan players
Cagliari Calcio players
A.C. Perugia Calcio players
Serie A players
Serie B players
Serie C players
Association football midfielders
Footballers from Sardinia